Ochromonas is a genus of algae belonging to the family Chromulinaceae.

The genus has cosmopolitan distribution.

Chlorosulfolipids, a class of biologically active compounds, was first discovered in some Ochromonas species.

Species
Accepted species:

Ochromonas bourrellyi 
Ochromonas carolina
Ochromonas cosmopoliticus  (?)
Ochromonas crenata  (?)
Ochromonas danica 
Ochromonas elegans 
Ochromonas globosa 
Ochromonas granularis 
Ochromonas lubibunda 
Ochromonas malhamensis (?)
Ochromonas minima 
Ochromonas minuta 
Ochromonas marina  (?)
Ochromonas mutabilis 
Ochromonas nana 
Ochromonas oblonga 
Ochromonas ostreaeformis 
Ochromonas ovalis 
Ochromonas pyriformis 
Ochromonas sociata 
Ochromonas sparseverrucosa 
Ochromonas stellaris 
Ochromonas triangulata 
Ochromonas tuberculata 
Ochromonas vallesiaca 
Ochromonas variabilis 
Ochromonas verrucosa 
Ochromonas viridis 

(?) not accepted by GBIF in August 2022.

References

Chrysophyceae
Heterokont genera